Lycium ruthenicum, is a flowering plant commonly known as Russian box thorn in the West. is a species of flowering plant in the nightshade family which can be found in Central Asia, southern part of Russia, throughout Northwest China, Northern India and Pakistan.  Also commonly known as black fruit wolfberry, siyah goji, and kaokee, it is a species of flowering plant in the nightshade family which can be found in Central Asia, southern part of Russia, throughout Northwest China, Northern India and Pakistan.

Description
The flowering time is June to August but can sometimes bloom in May too. Fruits mature from August to October.

Distribution and uses
In India, it grows in Nubra Valley where it is used by native people to cure blindness in camels.

References

Complete guide of black wolfberry. Sinaeangift. Retrieved May 25, 2017.

Notes

Schoenbeck-Temesy, 31
Baytop, 448

External links

 
 

ruthenicum
Flora of temperate Asia
Flora of Central Asia
Flora of the Indian subcontinent